Lake Bardawil ( Buḥayrat al-Bardawīl or سبخة البردويل Sabḵat al-Bardawīl), is a large, very saline lagoon nearby the protected area of Zaranik (also known for diversities of insects and waterbirds) in Egypt on the north coast of the Sinai Peninsula. It is considered to be one of the three major lakes of the Sinai Peninsula, along with the Great Bitter Lake and the Little Bitter Lake. It continues to decrease in size as sands move and is becoming more of a Playa or Sabkha than a lake. Between Port Said and Rafah are three main sabkha which extend from west to east: Sabkhat El Malaha (Lake Fouad), Sabkhat Bardawil (Lake Bardawil) and Sabkhat El Sheikh Zawayed.

It is shallow, reaching a depth of about 3 meters, and is separated from the Mediterranean Sea by a narrow sandbar and often the waters of the sea find their way there, making it saline. It has International Ramsar Convention protected wetlands with a large population of little tern. 30% of the recorded species in the Mediterranean Coast of Sinai are in Lake Bardawil. Six threatened species of flora exist at Lake Bardawil, including Iris mariae.

It has six habitats including "open water, wet salt marshes, saline sand flats and hummock (nebkas), stabilized sand dunes, interdune depressions, and mobile sand dunes."

Other than bird diversity, the area is known for sea turtles and bottlenose dolphins although high mortality rate of sea turtles has been concerning. Within IUCN Red Data Book of 2006 are 6 threatened plant species which are found near the Lake, these include Astragalus camelorum, Bellevalia salah-eidii, Biorum oliveri, Iris mariae, Lobularia arabica and Salsola tetragona. The first four are endemic species.

Some students of the Hebrew Exodus out of Egypt think that this location is near the fourth station of the Exodus, called Pi-hahiroth, saying "it may have been just west of the Western tip of Lake Bardawil."

It may be what Herodotus described as the Serbonian Bog, between Damietta and Mount Casius, in his Histories of  430BCE.

The Bardawil lagoons are named after the Crusader king Baldwin I. Based in Jerusalem, Baldwin raided Egypt in order to secure his kingdom. He fell ill while fishing in the Nile. While being carried back to Jerusalem in 1118 CE, Baldwin died in El-Arish.

During the Sinai and Palestine campaign of World War I, Allied soldiers of the Canterbury Mounted Rifles tried to cut a canal from the sea to the western end of Lake Bardawil in order to flood it and prevent forces of the Central Powers attacking Romani from the north, but they were unsuccessful.

References

Lagoons of Asia
Bardawil
Ramsar sites in Egypt